Chakalaka is a South African vegetable relish, usually spicy, that is traditionally served with bread, pap, samp, stews, or curries.  Chakalaka may have originated in the townships of Johannesburg or on the gold mines surrounding Johannesburg, when Mozambican mineworkers coming off shift cooked tinned produce (tomatoes, beans) with chili to produce a spicy Portuguese-style relish to accompany pap. Many variations of chakalaka exist, depending on region and family tradition. Some versions include beans, cabbage and butternut. For example, canned baked beans, canned tomatoes, onion, garlic, and curry paste can be used to make the dish.

It is frequently served at a braai (barbecue) or with Sunday lunch. It can be served cold or at room temperature.

See also

Indian pickle
List of African dishes

References

South African cuisine
Condiments
Namibian cuisine